Calopogon pallidus, the pale grass-pink, is a species of orchid native to the southeastern United States, from Louisiana to Virginia.

References

External links 
 Florida Native Orchids, Pale Grass Pink (Calopogon pallidus)
 Go Orchids, North American Orchid Conservation Center, Pale Grass Pink (Calopogon pallidus)
 North Carolina Native Plant Society

pallidus
Endemic orchids of the United States
Flora of the Southern United States
Flora of the Southeastern United States
Plants described in 1788
Flora without expected TNC conservation status
Taxa named by Alvan Wentworth Chapman